Hypoechinorhynchidae is a family of parasitic worms from the order Echinorhynchida.

Genera

Bolborhynchoides
Contains the following species:
 Bolborhynchoides exiguus (Achmerov, et al., 1941)

Hypoechinorhynchus
Contains the following species:
 Hypoechinorhynchus alaeopis Yamaguti, 1939	 
 Hypoechinorhynchus magellanicus Szidat, 1950

References

Acanthocephala families
Echinorhynchida